The Spell is a 1977 American made-for-television horror film which premiered on NBC as "The Big Event" Movie of the Week. It is directed by Lee Philips and stars Lee Grant, Susan Myers, Lelia Goldoni and Helen Hunt. It touches on the subject of telekinesis and follows the story of an adolescent girl who seeks revenge on those who ridicule her, while her mother tries to bring an end to her evil acts. It has gained a reputation as being an imitation of the 1976 classic Brian De Palma film Carrie as several similarities are present, while it has fallen somewhat under the radar over the years and is considered a "forgotten film".

Plot
Rita Matchett is a shy 15-year-old girl often picked upon for being overweight. One particular day in her high school gym, Rita is teased by her classmates and she attempts to defend herself. The girls take turns at rope climbing and Rita struggles to climb. She is opposite snooty classmate Jackie Segall. Jackie climbs to the top and begins to show off in front of the other girls by doing spins. Rita's stare becomes fixated on Jackie which causes her to fall off the rope and break her neck, killing her in the process.

Rita comes from a wealthy family and her home life is unhappy. She is neither close with her father, Glenn, nor her younger sister, Kristina, who view her as fat and unattractive, and often criticize her for her looks. Her mother, Marilyn, tries to maintain a balance in the home and is constantly upset by how Rita is treated and the rivalry between her daughters. Marilyn becomes furious with Rita when her attitude begins to change. However, she grows more concerned when Rita shows signs of abnormal behavior and starts speaking in chant following an argument.

It later becomes evident that Rita is dabbling in something dangerous as a number of "accidents" seem to occur; Glenn is almost injured in a hit-and-run incident but is unharmed, while Marilyn's friend, Kathleen, having been ill for sometime, suddenly dies due to spontaneous combustion and Kristina almost drowns in a swimming pool. Marilyn is initially not convinced that Rita is behind these attacks, but Kristina confirms her suspicions when she reveals to Marilyn that Rita has been visiting Jo Standish, the school gym teacher, and they chant together. Rita had threatened Kristina to keep quiet about it.

Glenn informs Rita that she will be leaving home to attend a private school in London, much to her disapproval, resulting in her acting aggressively. Marilyn sends Glenn and Kristina away for the night so that she can spend time with Rita. That evening, Marilyn follows Rita to Jo's house where she watches in secret as the two discuss the recent events and discovers that Jo caused the accidents so that Rita could seek revenge. When Jo tells Rita that their power will extend to a new community, Rita becomes upset as she believes that she will no longer be different and unique if others were to be like her. In the disagreement, the two begin to chant, and with her powerful new strength, Rita forces Jo to the ground. Back at home, Marilyn confronts Rita and begins to chant, which violently forces Rita to be thrown around the room. Marilyn tells her that it is over and if Rita insists on hurting her father and sister that she will destroy her. It is revealed that Marilyn also has power as Rita tries to retaliate and the two begin to constantly chant until Marilyn overpowers Rita, bringing it all to an end. Marilyn comforts a sobbing Rita telling her that it is all over.

Cast
 Lee Grant as Marilyn Matchett
 Susan Myers as Rita Matchett
 Lelia Goldoni as Jo Standish
 Helen Hunt as Kristina 'Kris' Matchett
 Jack Colvin as Dale Boyce
 James Olson as Glenn
 James Greene as Stan
 Wright King as Rian
 Barbara Bostock as Jill
 Doney Oatman as Jackie Segall
 Richard Carlyle as Hugh
 Kathleen Hughes as Fenetia 
 Robert Gibbons as Waiter
 Arthur Peterson as Ross
 Marneen Fields as Schoolmate (uncredited)

Production
The Spell went into production stages in the mid 1970s, when writer Brian Taggert developed the script and pitched it to Columbia Pictures, where he intended the film to receive a theatrical release. Columbia was impressed with Taggert's writing and his take on the theme of telekinesis. However, the film was slow to get off the ground and during the pre-production process, Brian De Palma's similarly themed Carrie became acclaimed and widely successful, which resulted in the film being converted into a teleplay for a network television Movie of the Week. Taggert claimed that he completed his script for the film while Stephen King was writing Carrie. Both films open with a similar scene in which the character, Rita, in The Spell, is teased and picked on by her classmates, which is how Carrie opened. As The Spell premiered on NBC three months following the release of Carrie, it was seen as an imitation.

Release

Premiere
The Spell was broadcast on NBC on February 20, 1977 at 8:00 pm.

Reception
The film has received mixed reviews from critics.

In an early review from Harriet Van Horne from New York Magazine, she said that "you will shudder at The Spell, giggle in the wrong places, and, NBC hopes, and stay tuned in to learn all about telekinesis." Of actress Lee Grant, she stated, "Grant is too fine an actress for this sort of TV trash".

In an online review for The Terror Trap, it was said of the film that "overall, a little slow at times but not bad". When reviewed for The Horror Honeys website, it was stated of the film that "It's not the perfect revenge film, but it is an interesting snapshot of the era and there are far worse ways to kill an evening". Chris Hartley of The Video Graveyard mentions that "The Spell is pretty forgettable stuff. When taken for what it is, it's not a complete waste of time and does have some unintentional chuckles and solid performances propping it up, but it's also just another forgotten 70s TV flick."

The film has been reviewed in several blog posts; in a 2009 blog post for Final Girl, Stacie Ponder said that "This is a made-for-TV effort that's fairly tame even for its time period" and "It's little more than a pleasant 70-minute diversion". Jeffery Berg of the jdbrecords commented that "it's pretty preposterous, kind of boring, and sometimes hilarious." When it film was reviewed in a blog post for Horror Movie a Day, it was said that "even as a TV Movie this thing is shockingly dull throughout."

Home media
In the United States, The Spell received a VHS release courtesy of Worldvision Home Entertainment Inc. in 1984 following its television broadcast, which was rare considering that television films of the time were not picked up for home video distribution. The film received a second VHS release in the U.S. from GoodTimes Entertainment. It has been released on VHS in several European countries including Finland and Spain. It has never been made available on DVD format.

It was released on Blu-ray format in North America on September 5, 2017 via Scream Factory, a subsidiary of Shout! Factory, under license from 20th Century Fox Home Entertainment and MGM Home Entertainment. The set contains the film's original broadcast ratio of 1.33:1, DTS-HD Master Audio 2.0 and English Subtitles, while special features consist of a new commentary by made-for-TV historian and author Amanda Reyes and a new interview with screenwriter Brian Taggert.

It was available for streaming in the United Kingdom via Amazon Prime Video, which was added to the service on February 21, 2019 and removed on September 5, 2019.

Similarities to Carrie
With the telekinesis theme becoming increasingly popular following the release of Brian De Palma's Carrie, an adaptation of Stephen King's 1974 novel, many films attempted to recreate this theme, with little success; The Spell was the first to do so and although claimed that the script with written prior to King's novel, many similarities appear in The Spell including the opening scene in which the character, Rita, is bullied by her classmates, family issues, and telekinetic revenge. In the final scene in the film, which concerns the showdown between Rita and her mother, Marilyn, Rita uses her power to hurl knives at Marilyn; although missing her aim, it is much like the ending to Carrie in which Carrie kills her mother by launching flying knives through the air. Many films which have been considered imitations followed this, some of which include, Jennifer (1978), Patrick (1978), Evilspeak (1982), and to a lesser extent, Laserblast (1978). Other films with a similar theme include The Fury (1978) and Firestarter (1984). (Another Stephen King movie.)

Further reading
 Educational Institutions in Horror Film: A History of Mad Professors, Student Bodies, and Final Exams — by Andrew L. Grunzke (April 2015, Palgrave Macmillan)

Notes

References

External links

 
 
 
 
 
 
 The Spell at the TCM Movie Database

1977 horror films
1970s supernatural horror films
1977 television films
1977 films
American supernatural horror films
Films about bullying
Films about magic and magicians
American films about revenge
1970s horror drama films
American horror drama films
American horror television films
Films about telekinesis
Films directed by Lee Philips
NBC network original films
1970s English-language films
1970s American films